Yeni Həyat may refer to:
Yeni Həyat, Khachmaz, Azerbaijan
Yeni Həyat, Qusar, Azerbaijan
Yeni Həyat, Shamkir, Azerbaijan